This article contains a list of rugby union players who have represented the Melbourne Rebels in a Super Rugby competition match since they joined the competition in 2011. Players are ordered in order of first appearance. Players who played in the Rebels inaugural game are ordered in alphabetical order, but whereafter are ordered in position from No. 1 to No. 15 if more than one player debut in the same match at the same point of debut.  Players are given an official 'Rebel number' on their first Super Rugby appearance, or appearance in an regionalised competition such as Super Rugby AU or Super Rugby Trans-Tasman.

A player's nationality shown is taken from the nationality at the highest honour for the national side obtained; or if never capped internationally their place of birth. Senior caps take precedence over junior caps or place of birth; junior caps take precedence over place of birth. A player's nationality at debut may be different from the nationality shown. Combination sides like the British and Irish Lions or Pacific Islanders are not national sides, or nationalities.

Players listed in Bold denote a player who is internationally capped. Players may have played in another position than listed, but only main positions are listed. Players may have been contracted for others seasons, but only seasons in which they played an official Super Rugby match are included.

Rebels players

 Statistics correct as of end of 2022 Super Rugby Pacific season
  denotes a player currently playing for the Melbourne Rebels.

Notes

Contracted players who did not play

A number of players have been signed by the Melbourne Rebels but not appeared in a match, or are currently signed to the Rebels, but yet to feature in an official Super Rugby match. The following list includes all those players. Players on training contracts or trial contracts are not included here. Players in Bold are internationally capped. Players are listed in alphabetical order.

  Ignacio Calas
  Ryan Cocker
  Trent Dyer
  Mees Erasmus
  Pama Fou
  Harley Fox
  Jed Gillespie
  Eyda Haisila
  Navarre Haisila
  David Horwitz
  Henry Hutchison
  Ngalu Kavapalu
  Boyd Killingworth
  Kentaro Kodama
  Tony Lamborn
  Jono Lance
  Patrick Lavemai
  Sione Lolesio
  Antonio Masina
  Jack McGregor
  Declan Moore
  Isaiah Mosese
  Dallan Murphy
  Joeli Niubalavu
  Rory O'Connor
  Caylib Oosthuizen
  Hunter Paisami
  Dennis Pili-Gaitau
  Divad Palu
  Moses Poreo
  Harry Potter
  Kitione Ratu
  Sebastian Sialau
  James So'oialo
  Leafi Talataina
  Tautalatasi Tasi
  Chris Thomson
  Alex Toolis
  Sione Tui
  Taliu Tuia
  Ah-mu Tuimalealiifano
  Ikapote Tupai
  Emosi Tuqiri
  Junior Uelese

References

Melbourne Rebels
Super Rugby players
Super Rugby lists